Luigi Griffanti (20 April 1917 – 2 May 2006) was an Italian footballer. He played as a goalkeeper for Vigevano, Fiorentina, Torino, and Venezia in the 1930s and 1940s. He also earned two caps for the Italy national football team in 1942.

References

External links
Profile at Enciclopediadelcalcio.it

1917 births
2006 deaths
Italian footballers
Italy international footballers
ACF Fiorentina players
Torino F.C. players
Venezia F.C. players
Carrarese Calcio players
Association football goalkeepers
Vigevano Calcio players